The 2012 Slamdance Film Festival was a film festival held in Park City, Utah from January 20 to January 26, 2012. It was the 18th iteration of the Slamdance Film Festival, a complementary fest to the Sundance Film Festival.

Festival
With nearly 5,000 submissions, 18 feature-length films were shown along with 75 short films and 8 special screenings selected from across the globe. The festival took place at the Treasure Mountain Inn on Main Street in Park City. Festival alumni include acclaimed directors, such as Christopher Nolan ("The Dark Knight'), Seth Gordon ("Horrible Bosses") and Oren Peli ("Paranormal Activity").  
 
Festivities included the Opening and Closing Night Parties at the Carhartt Lounge, panel discussions, daily happy hours and the annual Sled Off. The festival also featured Morning Coffee Master Classes with Neil Young, Jonathan Demme and Stan Lee. “These events with Stan Lee, Neil Young and Jonathan Demme are incredible opportunities to learn from some of the world's best storytellers, and a rare chance to experience the stories, wisdom, and tribulations of iconic artists and filmmakers,” said Peter Baxter, Slamdance President and Co-Founder. Demme and Young shared their stories about making the documentary Neil Young Journeys. Young also confirmed that he is working with longtime collaborator Crazy Horse on a new album. Stan Lee and director Will Hess discussed the making of their new doc With Great Power: The Stan Lee Story. 

Special screenings, included Wild In The Streets, No Room For Rockstars, Neil Young Journeys and Ed Wood's Lost Film Final Curtain.

Films
The feature competitions at Slamdance are limited to first-time filmmakers working with production budgets of $1 million or less. The festival showcased 10 Narrative Films and 8 Documentary Films, including 13 World Premieres.

Narrative competition

Documentary competition

Awards
Slamdance co-founder and president Peter Baxter is quoted as saying, “This year's narrative and documentary competitions are stronger than ever, and these filmmakers represent the vanguard of true independent filmmaking.” The following films were honored with prizes from the Grand Jury, audience members and festival sponsors.

Grand Jury Awards

Grand Jury Sparky Award for Best Narrative Film - Welcome to Pine Hill by Keith Miller
Special Jury Award for Bold Originality - Heavy Girls by Axel Ranisch
Grand Jury Sparky Award for Feature Documentary - No Ashes, No Phoenix by Jens Pfeifer
Grand Jury Award for Short Documentary - The Professional by Skylar Neilsen
Grand Jury Sparky Award for Animation - Venus by Tor Fruergaard
Grand Jury Sparky Award for Short Film - I am John Wayne by Christina Choe
Special Jury Prize for Experimental Short - Solipsist by Andrew Huang
Honorable Mention for Best Ensemble - I'm Coming Over by Sam Handel

Audience Awards
Audience Award for Feature Documentary - Getting Up by Caskey Ebeling
Audience Award for Feature Narratives - BINDLESTIFFS by Andrew Edison

Sponsored Awards
Spirit of Slamdance Sparky Award - Heavy Girls by Axel Ranisch
The Kodak Vision Award for Best Cinematography - Faith, Love and Whiskey by Kristina Nikolova
Panasonic AF100 Award for 'The Five Flavors of Filmmaking' Competition - Josh Gibson, director of the short film Kudzu Vine

References

Slamdance Film Festival
Slamdance Festival
Slamdance
Slamdance
2012 in American cinema